Bohus Fortress (also known as Baahus or Båhus, originally: Bágahús) lies along the old Norwegian–Swedish border in Kungälv, Bohuslän, Sweden, north east from Hisingen where the Göta river splits into two branches ( north of Gothenburg).

Initial construction 
The construction of Bohus Fortress began in 1308 under King Haakon V Magnuson, king of Norway from 1299 to 1319. Håkon V also initiated construction of Norwegian fortresses at Akershus and Vardøhus as part of a broader defensive policy. At the time Bohuslän (Båhuslen) was Norwegian territory and served as the main Norwegian defence against Sweden, along the coast as well as the strong point for the Bohuslän region from 1308 to 1658.

Medieval castle 
According to architect Guthorm Kavli:

Fortress 

The fortress was attacked or besieged 14 times, but was never captured. During the Northern Seven Years' War, in 1563–1570, it was seriously damaged. This occurred in 1566, when Swedish forces successfully stormed the 'Red Tower' in the northeast of the fortress. Two men from the garrison volunteered to detonate the tower's magazine, causing a massive explosion (the "Bohus Bang") which killed hundreds of Swedish soldiers and thwarted the attack. As a reward the family of one of the volunteers received a piece of land which is still owned by his descendants.

The Norwegians rebuilt the fortress of stone and brick, and reinforced it substantially. The reconstruction immediately after the war was directed by Hans Paaske (Påske) from the Netherlands. On 1 January 1590 James VI of Scotland and his wife Anne of Denmark came to Bohus. They gave Henrik Gyldenstierne, Captain of Bohus, a ring and a gold chain worth 3,000 Danish dalers.

In 1593–1604, similar to the construction then undertaken at Akershus in Oslo, Bohus was upgraded to a bastion fortress. A new outer fortification was raised. This construction was one of the early works of Hans van Steenwinckel, also from the Netherlands, who later became noted for his Dutch Renaissance style design in Denmark.

As Swedish invasions continuously threatened Norwegian Båhuslen during this time period, the improvement of the fortifications went on for years. For example, starting in the summer of 1651 and until the autumn of 1652, the Dutch engineer Isaac van Geelkerck supervised the construction of two corner towers along the south façade and a new ring wall that was constructed around the arsenal building.

Loss to Sweden 
Under the terms of the Treaty of Roskilde in 1658, Denmark–Norway ceded the Danish provinces of Scania, Blekinge and Halland (the latter was agreed to belong to Sweden for a period of 30 years after the Peace of Brömsebro, but was given to Sweden permanently in the treaty of Roskilde) and the Norwegian provinces Trøndelag and Bohuslän (including the Bohus Fortress).

Last Siege 
After an unsuccessful attempt to recapture the fortress in 1676, a Norwegian army under the command of  Ulrik Fredrik Gyldeløve returned in June 1678. Some 850 defenders faced 16.000 attackers, who fired 20-30.000 iron gun shots, 2265 "bombs" with chemical and biological content, 384 explosive grenades, 384 "great stone boulders", 161 glowing fire shots, 79 sacks filled with grenades and 600 "great mortar rounds". Also a number of mines was exploded under the outer walls. After six weeks of constant battering, the fortress was saved by an approaching Swedish detachment. At this time, there was 400 survivors in the fortress, 300 dead, and 120 wounded "who had their arms and legs shot off". The fortress itself was almost completely ruined and the repairs went on for some 50–70 years, but with small financial support and only the most important work was done.

After Denmark–Norway ceded the territory which included Bohus Fortress, Fredriksten Fortress was constructed in Fredrikshald on the newly established Norwegian-Swedish border.

Since the Bohus Fortress no longer lay on the border, it was of small use to Sweden, which relied on the existing New Älvsborg at Gothenburg and the new Carlsten Fortress built at Marstrand.

Prison 
Instead the fortress was used as a prison. The most noted prisoner was the radical pietist Thomas Leopold, who spent 42 years of his life behind bars, 32 of those at Bohus, for his alleged heresies. His stone-clad cell still exists in the castle.

In the tower Fars Hatt, the original dungeon is still visible from above. A report from the 18th century states this as "a great depth, which has a floor of an iron net, upon which the delinquent has to walk and sleep. The floor accepts all their faeces, but then returns an unbearable stench, that soon makes the poor prisoner confess whatever crime he has committed". In those days, you were only put in prison until you confessed - then you got your immediate punishment: fine, shame, dismembering or death. Today the floor is more forgiving, but it still gives you a hint on what it might have been to sit "in the tower".

In the tower of Sven Hall, an old medieval dungeon has also been discovered, but it is hardly visible today. Probably it was no better than the one mentioned above, since evidence suggest that it was along the sewer exit from the fortress. Today it can be reached only by professionals, and is not visible except from the small daylight opening.

Modern times 
At the end of the 18th century it was decided that the now unused fortress should be demolished. Demolition crews worked at the fortress for two months, after that the money allocated for the job had run out. Residents of the nearby town of Kungälv used the dressed stone from the fortress to build houses. However, much of the fortress is still intact, including the large northern tower, Fars hatt ("Father's hat"). , the fortress is a museum open to visitors during summer.

References

External links 

 

Buildings and structures completed in 1308
Buildings and structures completed in the 14th century
Buildings and structures completed in the 17th century
Castles in Bohuslän
Forts in Sweden
Bahus
Bohus
Museums in Västra Götaland County
Military and war museums in Sweden
17th-century fortifications
14th-century fortifications
Buildings and structures in Kungälv Municipality